Turnše (in older sources also Turnišče) is a settlement south of Radomlje in the Municipality of Domžale in the Upper Carniola region of Slovenia.

Castle and manor

Črnelo Castle used to stand on Hribar Hill above Turnše. The castle was first mentioned in written sources in 1297 but at the end of the 17th century it was abandoned for a manor below the castle. The castle itself was probably used for building material because no trace of it remains today.

References

External links

Turnše on Geopedia

Populated places in the Municipality of Domžale